Georg Ots Tallinn Music College is a music school in Tallinn, Estonia.

The school is grown up from Tallinn Higher Music School (founded in 1919). In 2019, the school celebrated its 100th anniversary.

Alumni
See: :Category:Tallinn Georg Ots Music School alumni

References

External links
 

Music schools in Estonia
Schools in Tallinn